Danube Valley Railway (German: Donautalbahn) may refer to:

the Donaueschingen–Immendingen section of the Black Forest Railway (Baden)
the Immendingen–Tuttlingen section of the Plochingen–Immendingen railway
the Tuttlingen–Inzigkofen railway
the Inzigkofen–Sigmaringen section of the Tübingen–Sigmaringen railway
the Ulm–Sigmaringen railway 
the Ulm–Neuoffingen section of the Ulm–Augsburg railway
the Ingolstadt–Neuoffingen railway
the Regensburg–Ingolstadt railway